Pelargoderus marginipennis is a species of beetle belonging to the family Cerambycidae.

Description

Distribution
This species can be found in Sumatra.

References

 Biolib
 Global species
 C. RITSEMA «TWO NEW SPECIES OF THE LONGICORN GENUS PELARGODERUS» on Biostor.org

marginipennis